Mount Jackson is located in the Lewis Range, Glacier National Park in the U.S. state of Montana. Mount Jackson is the fourth tallest mountain in Glacier National Park and it is situated on the Continental Divide. Both the mountain and its namesake Jackson Glacier are easily seen from the Going-to-the-Sun Road. Harrison Glacier, the park's largest remaining glacier, is located on the mountain's southern flank. Based on the Köppen climate classification, Mount Jackson has an alpine climate characterized by long, usually very cold winters, and short, cool to mild summers. Temperatures can drop below −10 °F with wind chill factors below −30 °F.

Geology

Like other mountains in Glacier National Park, Mount Jackson is composed of sedimentary rock laid down during the Precambrian to Jurassic periods.

See also

 Mountains and mountain ranges of Glacier National Park (U.S.)
 Geology of the Rocky Mountains

References

Gallery

External links
 Weather forecast: Mount Jackson

Mountains of Flathead County, Montana
Mountains of Glacier County, Montana
Mountains of Glacier National Park (U.S.)
Lewis Range
Mountains of Montana